Ambigu is a French term that was adopted to mean 'a mixture of things' relating to a type of meal that was popular amongst the English upper class during the mid-17th and mid-18th centuries.  It was an evening meal that was less formal than dinner but still planned with a set table and varied types of cold food at the sideboard.

References
Davidson, Alan.  Oxford Companion to Food (1999), "Ambigu".  

French cuisine